Păuleni-Ciuc ( or colloquially Pálfalva, Hungarian pronunciation:, meaning Paul's Village of Csík) is a commune in Harghita County, Romania. It lies in the Székely Land, an ethno-cultural region in eastern Transylvania, and is composed of three villages:

Demographics

The commune has an absolute Székely (Hungarian) majority. According to the 2011 census it has a population of 1,822 of which 98.3% or 1,791 are Hungarian.

References

Communes in Harghita County
Localities in Transylvania
Székely communities